Juma Mosque of Ordubad - is located in Ordubad, Azerbaijan and is one of the cultic constructions of Ordubad city. The building is located on the highest place of the city.

Architecture
External architectural appearance of the mosque is dated to the 17th century according to its architectural segmentations. A ligature fixed on the entrance of the building shows that it was constructed in 1604, during the reign of the Safavid Iranian king Abbas I (r. 1588–1629). However, some elements in a plan of the mosque evidence that it was built earlier, but in the 17th century it was just reconstructed again. Three-paced praying hall takes the central place in the plan. Usage of deep arched niches attached to the frames of the arches is the peculiar feature of the architecture of cultic constructions. Walls of the mosque were built of rubble stone and plastered with 21x21x5 cm bricks.

See also
 List of mosques in Azerbaijan

References

Monuments and memorials in Azerbaijan
Mosques in Azerbaijan
Safavid architecture
Persian-Caucasian architecture
Ordubad